Margaret Sheridan, Comtesse de Renéville (1912-1980) was a British writer who wrote under the name Mary Motley. Sheridan was daughter of sculptress Clare Sheridan.

Life
Her father, Wilfred Sheridan was killed at the Battle of Loos on 25 September 1915.  A sister died in infancy.  She accompanied her mother to live in America in her early years.

Sheridan spent some time in Biskra, Algeria, where, in 1937, her brother Richard died of appendicitis, aged twenty-one, and she travelled extensively in the Saharan region.  In 1935 she married Comte Guy de Renéville, an officer in the French army, and later Chef de Cabinet Militaire to the Governor General of French Equatorial Africa.

She wrote autobiographies about her time in Algeria and the French Congo. Her mother died in 1970. When Margaret died in 1980 her copyrights reverted to Jonathan Frewen, who had inherited her mother's copyrights in 1972 from his father Roger Frewen, who was Clare Sheridan's nephew [Clare Sheridan, Roger Frewen Wills, Somerset House, London, United Kingdom].

Bibliography
 'Devils in Waiting' (1959)
 'Morning Glory' (1961)

References

External links
 Items donated to the Horniamn Museum

1912 births
1980 deaths
Women autobiographers
British autobiographers
British women writers
British expatriates in Algeria
British expatriates in the United States
British expatriates in the Republic of the Congo